Sanjrani, a significant Baloch chiefdom, the Sanjranis family who ruled Seistan with its capital at Chakansur in the early and late 19th century.

History
At the end of the 18th century, part of the Narui, belonging to the Baloch tribe, left their native places and, by order of Alem Khan, settled on the banks of Helmand. The leader of this clan, who at first was considered a tributary, managed little by little to achieve complete independence from his neighbors and to transfer, before his death, a firmly established power to his son Dost Mohammed Khan, whose death, which followed, in 1857, was a heavy loss for his fellow tribesmen.

After him, the only son left was Dervish Khan, but the brother of Dost Mohammed Khan, Sherif Khan, was appointed the leader of the tribe; he was considered the most powerful man in the country.

The example of the Narui was soon followed by the Tuks, a Baloch tribe from the Haran region. Their leader Khan Jan, the son of Jan Bek and the grandson of Rushan, for some time began to appear on the right bank of Helmand. At that time, Jalal ed-Din-khan, the eldest son of Bahram-khan, (from the Kayyanid families) who fell in love with the daughter of the Baloch leader and succeeded in marrying her, gave as a gift to his father-in-law a small fortress Barengi-siyah, on the site of which at present is the city of Jahanabad.

Khan Jan's first concern was to assert his independence. To this end, he called on his fellow tribesmen to settle in the vicinity of the fortress, united some of them into bands of robbers and, robbing the villages bordering on Persia and Afghanistan, accumulated considerable wealth. He expanded his possessions either by purchasing lands from the impoverished Keyanids, or by forcibly expelling them. The dekhkans who settled on these lands hardly obeyed the new owner and often left their homes, and Balochs from Haran settled in their place.

Khan Jan had six sons: Mein Khan, Jan Bek, Ali Khan, Ibrahim Khan, Shahpasond Khan and Shirdil Khan. His second son predeceased his father. According to established custom, the power of the clan leader was to pass to Mein Khan. However, Ali Khan invited his older brother to Chakhansur, treacherously killed him and took possession of all the property. Addicted to the vices that exist in the East, he did not enjoy the fruits of his crime for long: in 1840, Ali Khan died of a serious illness.

His successor was Ibrahim Khan, known in Europe as the killer of Dr. Forbes. He was known as an enterprising and energetic person, but his fanaticism and especially destructive addiction to opium, as well as the cruelty characteristic of him during periods of intoxication, terrified his family members, subjects and strangers. Therefore, his brother Shahpesend Khan, fearing for his life, was forced to flee. He settled in Mashhad, where he received a small allowance from the Persian government. As for Ibrahim Khan, he rarely stayed in Chakhansur. Every year he hunted wild boars in the thickets of the Helmand delta, accompanied by a large retinue of armed people, often turning them into gangs of robbers, hoping for rich prey.

References

History of Balochistan